This is a list of ski areas and resorts in Oceania.

Australia

Australian Capital Territory

Corin Forest

Heard Island and McDonald Islands
Big Ben (Heard Island)
Mount Drygalski

New South Wales

Charlotte Pass
Perisher
Blue Cow Mountain
Guthega
Perisher Valley
Smiggin Holes
Selwyn Snowfields
Thredbo (Mt. Kosciusko)

Tasmania

Ben Lomond
Mount Mawson
Mount Wellington, Hobart

Victoria

Falls Creek
Lake Mountain
Mount Baw Baw
Mount Buffalo
Mount Buller
Mount Hotham
Dinner Plain
Mount St Gwinear
Mount Stirling

Indonesia

Papua
Maoke Mountains
Carstensz Glacier
Ngga Pulu

New Zealand

North Island
Tukino (club skifield)
Turoa
Whakapapa
Manganui (club skifield)

South Island
Craigieburn Range
Broken River (club skifield)
Craigieburn Valley (club skifield)
Mount Cheeseman  (club skifield)
Mount Olympus (club skifield)
Fox Peak (club skifield)
Hanmer Springs Ski Area (club skifield)
Mount Dobson
Mount Hutt
Mount Lyford
Mount Potts (heliskiing and snowcatting only)
Ohau
Porters Ski Area
Roundhill
Tasman Glacier (Heliski)
Temple Basin  (club skifield)
Rainbow
Awakino (club skifield)
Invincible Snowfields (helicopter access only)
Around Queenstown
Coronet Peak
The Remarkables
Around Wanaka
Cardrona Alpine Resort
Snow Farm (cross-country skiing only)
Treble Cone

United States

Hawaii
Mauna Kea

References

Oceania
Ski
Skiing in Oceania
 
Lists of tourist attractions in Australia